This article is a list of SUNYAC champions.

Fall Sports

Men's Cross Country

Women's Cross Country

Field Hockey 
The SUNYAC terminated field hockey after the 1986 season, and later reinstated it prior to the 2000 season

Men's Soccer

Women's Soccer

Women's Tennis

Volleyball 
The SUNYAC Conference uses a two divisional format, both East (E) and West (W) division regular season champions are named along with their correlating records

Winter Sports

Men's Basketball

Women's Basketball

Men's Ice Hockey

Men's Swimming and Diving

Women's Swimming and Diving

Men's Indoor Track and Field

Women's Indoor Track and Field

Wrestling

Spring Sports

Baseball 

2017 SUNYAC Tournament cancelled due to weather and unplayable conditions making regular season champions SUNY Oswego the tournament champions

Men's Golf

Men's Lacrosse

Women's Lacrosse

Softball

Men's Tennis

Men's Outdoor Track and Field

Women's Outdoor Track and Field

External links
 SUNYAC Online

State University of New York Athletic Conference